Mine Gap Run is a tributary of Catawissa Creek in Columbia County, Pennsylvania, in the United States. The stream is polluted and acidic. However, it is considered to be a coldwater fishery. The main rock formations in the stream's watershed are the Mauch Chunk Formation, the Spechty Kopf Formation, the Pocono Formation, and the Buddys Run Member of the Catskill Formation.

Course
Mine Gap Run begins on Catawissa Mountain in Roaring Creek Township. It crosses Mine Gap Road within a few hundred feet of its source and flows northeast in a valley for some distance. The stream eventually turns north for a few tenths of a mile. It then turns northeast and enters Beaver Township. A few tenths of a mile further downstream, it reaches its confluence with Catawissa Creek.

Hydrology
Mine Gap Run experiences some form of pollution. The stream is acidic and infertile. Its pH is 6.6 and the concentration of alkalinity in it is 4 milligrams per liter.

Geography and geology

The lower reaches of Mine Gap Run are on rock of the Mauch Chunk Formation. The middle reaches of the stream are on rock of the Spechty Kopf Formation and the Pocono Formation. The stream's upper reaches are on rock of the Buddys Run Member of the Catskill Formation.

Watershed
The watershed is mostly in Roaring Creek Township, but a portion of it is in Beaver Township. Part of the watershed is in Pennsylvania State Game Lands Number 58. The watershed is in the Shumans United States Geological Survey quadrangle.

Mine Gap Run flows through forested land in its middle reaches. However, there is agricultural land in its upper and lower reaches. 72 percent of the stream is within  and 80 percent of the length of the stream is within  of a road. 90 percent of its length is within  of a road.

History, etymology, and recreation
Mine Gap Run is named after mines in its vicinity.

A 1992 report stated that Mine Gap Run was a poor site for angling.

Biology
The Pennsylvania Department of Environmental Protection considers Mine Gap Run to be a cold water fishery. The water chemistry of the stream is suitable for brook trout and is similar to other streams with substantial populations of wild brook trout. However, no fish have been observed in it. The reason for this is unknown, but possible theories include a total fish kill. Stocking of fingerling brook trout in the stream has been proposed.

See also
Fisher Run, next tributary of Catawissa Creek going downstream
Beaver Run (Catawissa Creek), next tributary of Catawissa Creek going upstream
List of tributaries of Catawissa Creek

References

Rivers of Columbia County, Pennsylvania
Tributaries of Catawissa Creek
Rivers of Pennsylvania